Oscar Cavagnis (12 December 1974 – 19 May 2021) was an Italian cyclist. He competed professionally from 1998 to 2002 and rode in the 2002 Giro d'Italia.

Cavagnis died on 19 May 2021, aged 46, from an avalanche on the Königspitze.

Major results

1996
 1st Prologue (TTT) Giro delle Regioni
 2nd Gran Premio di Poggiana
1997
 1st GP Industrie del Marmo
 1st Stage 5 Giro d'Abruzzo
 2nd Overall Giro del Ticino
1st Stage 2
 2nd Overall Tour de Nouvelle-Calédonie
 5th Gran Premio della Liberazione
1998
 1st Stages 5 & 9 Peace Race
2000
 1st Stage 1 Settimana Internazionale Coppi e Bartali
 2nd Giro di Campania
 3rd Route Adélie
 5th Classic Haribo
2002
 2nd Poreč Trophy 3
 6th Trofeo dell'Etna
 8th Grand Prix d'Ouverture La Marseillaise

References

External links

1974 births
2021 deaths
Italian male cyclists
Cyclists from Bergamo
Deaths in avalanches